Roy Francis Adkins (4 October 1947 – 28 September 1990) was an English gangster. He was a recognised London gangland figure during the 1970s and 80s.

Biography
Adkins started his career in robbery and, as with many criminal figures during that period, moved into drug smuggling, primarily cannabis. He had a reputation for a quick temper and for being very physically imposing and strong and was a feared figure for many years. During the 1980s he became partners with Klaas Bruinsma in the Netherlands and was allegedly appointed as head of the drugs division of the Bruinsma organisation. Adkins was implicated in April 1990 in the murder in Spain of ex train robber Charles Wilson although this was never proven. Adkins was involved in a fight and shoot out with Bruinsma in the famous Amsterdam night club/brothel Yab Yum and his refusal to submit or back down to Bruinsma is widely believed to have directly led to his murder.

Death
On 28 September 1990, Adkins was seen with two Colombian men at the American Hotel, Amsterdam. According to Adkins' past accomplice, Sam O'Neil, Adkins had been smuggling stolen emeralds through the Netherlands for the Colombians, however, one shipment had been stolen. O'Neil had seen Adkins in the American Hotel's Nightwatch bar, though Adkins had indicated O'Neil should move along. Some time later that evening, Adkins was shot dead.
After his death, the Metropolitan Police seized £900,000 as it was suspected to be proceeds of crime. These assets were later released after an appeal from the legatees of the Will.

In 1993, police considered reopening the investigation into Adkins' and Wilson's murders due to the murder of Donald Urquhart.

See also
List of unsolved murders

References

1947 births
1990 deaths
British people murdered abroad
Criminals from London
English drug traffickers
English gangsters
Deaths by firearm in the Netherlands
Male murder victims
Murdered British gangsters
Organised crime in London
People from Hammersmith
People murdered by Dutch organized crime
Unsolved murders in the Netherlands
1990 murders in the Netherlands